Sol Yaged (December 8, 1922 – May 11, 2019) was an American jazz clarinetist who was strongly influenced by Benny Goodman.

Life and career
Yaged was born in Brooklyn, New York and began playing the clarinet at the age of 12 after hearing Goodman's broadcasts for Nabisco in 1935. He studied under a clarinetist for the New York Philharmonic but turned down a classical career to play jazz in New York City nightclubs, such as Jimmy Ryan's and the Swing Club.

After serving in the Army for three years during World War II, Yaged played clarinet with professional groups continuously for over 70 years, with such musicians as Phil Napoleon, Coleman Hawkins, Red Allen, and Jack Teagarden. Beginning in the 1960s, he began working primarily as an ensemble leader in New York City. In the 1990s he worked in Felix Endico's swing band. Yaged served as a consultant on Benny Goodman's musical style for the 1956 film, The Benny Goodman Story.

From 1996–97, he worked under the musical direction of bandleader Jack Vartan at the Stony Hill Inn, Bergen County, New Jersey.

Family
Yaged's wife, Zelda (April 8, 1925 – January 31, 1994), died from cancer at age 68. They had two children.

Discography
 It Might as Well Be Swing (Herald, 1956)
 Jazz at the Metropole (Philips, 1961)
 One More Time (Lane, 1967)
 Your Wish Is My Command (Pine Hill Records, 2019)

As sideman
 1955 Horn o' Plenty, Charlie Shavers
 1957 Stormy Weather, Red Allen
 1968 The Music Room, Doug Duke
 1997 Personal Choice, Jack Teagarden
 1997 The Tenor for All Seasons: 1958–1959, Coleman Hawkins
 2005 The Very Best of the Cole Porter Songbook, Cole Porter

References

External links
 [ Sol Yaged at Allmusic (cache)]
 All About Jazz website

1922 births
2019 deaths
American jazz clarinetists
Jewish American musicians
Musicians from New York (state)
Musicians from Brooklyn
Military personnel from New York City
United States Army personnel of World War II
Jewish jazz musicians
Jazz musicians from New York (state)
20th-century clarinetists
21st-century clarinetists
20th-century American musicians
21st-century American musicians
20th-century American male musicians
21st-century American male musicians
21st-century American Jews